Rahi Jeevan Sarnobat (Marathi: राही सरनोबत) is a female athlete from India who competes in the 25 metre pistol shooting event. She won her first gold medal at the 2008 Commonwealth Youth Games in Pune, India. She is the first woman to win a gold medal in shooting at the Asian Games for India – she won the gold at the 2018 Jakarta Palembang Asian Games in the women's 25 metre pistol event. She won two gold medals in 2010 Commonwealth Games in New Delhi, the first of the two golds in coming in the 25 metre pistol pair event with Anisa Sayyed. She had previously won gold in the 25 metre pistol event at the 2008 Youth Commonwealth Games, which were held in India.

Personal life and background 
Sarnobat hails from Kolhapur in Maharashtra. During her school days, she was introduced to firearms as part of NCC training. She demonstrated natural skills in using firearms from an early age. In her early days of the sport, Sarnobat had to navigate inadequate infrastructure and facilities in her home town of Kolhapur. She then decided to train in Mumbai, which had better facilities. Her inspiration is fellow Maharashtrian and 50m rifle pro World Champion Tejaswini Sawant.

Professional achievements 
Sarnobat became India's first pistol shooter to win a gold medal in the World Cup when she won the 25 metre pistol event in the ISSF World Cup in Changwon. In the 2014 Commonwealth Games at Glasgow, she won gold in the women's 25 metre pistol event. In the same year, she won the bronze medal in the 25 metre pistol team event at the 2014 Asian Games at Incheon, where she teamed up with Anisa Sayyed and Heena Sidhu. An injury caused by an accident in 2015 came as a setback for Sarnobat; it affected her elbow, which took almost two years to fully heal. She made it back to the Indian national team and started working with German coach Munkhbayar Dorjsuren, who helped Sarnobat gain physical fitness and mental strength. Ironically Dorjsuren was one of Sarnobat's competitors at the 2012 Olympics.

Her bronze medal in the 2011 World Cup event at Fort Benning led to her selection for the London Olympics in 2012, thereby becoming the first female Indian shooter to qualify for the 25 metre sports pistol event in the Olympics.

In May 2015, Sarnobat was recommended for the country's prestigious Arjuna Award by the National Rifle Association of India (NRAI).

On 22 August 2018, she became the first Indian woman to become an individual Asian Games gold medallist in shooting by winning the 25 metre pistol event with a Games record score of 34. She won the shoot-off against her Thai opponent to win the gold.

In ISSF World Cup in Osijek, Sarnobat won the gold medal in the women's 25m pistol event.

The  30-year-old fired a final score of 39 after qualifying second with a total of  591. Her stupendous performance in the final earned her the Tokyo's ticket.

 Sarnobat won the gold medal at the Munich World Cup event in 2019 and was selected for the 2020 Tokyo Olympics.

References

Indian female sport shooters
Living people
People from Kolhapur
Sportswomen from Maharashtra
Shooters at the 2010 Commonwealth Games
Commonwealth Games gold medallists for India
1990 births
Olympic shooters of India
Shooters at the 2012 Summer Olympics
Shooters at the 2020 Summer Olympics
Asian Games medalists in shooting
Shooters at the 2010 Asian Games
Shooters at the 2014 Asian Games
Shooters at the 2018 Asian Games
Asian Games gold medalists for India
Asian Games bronze medalists for India
Commonwealth Games silver medallists for India
Shooters at the 2014 Commonwealth Games
Commonwealth Games medallists in shooting
21st-century Indian women
21st-century Indian people
Medalists at the 2014 Asian Games
Medalists at the 2018 Asian Games
Recipients of the Arjuna Award
Medallists at the 2010 Commonwealth Games
Medallists at the 2014 Commonwealth Games